The 2016–17 PFF Women's League season is the inaugural of the women's national league of the Philippines. The season started on November 12, 2016 and ended on November 20, 2017.

The De La Salle University secured the league title on their first second round match against OutKast winning over the latter, 3–0.

Format
The league follows a double round robin format. The team with the most points by the end of the season are crowned champions. The first round which was held at the Rizal Memorial Stadium commenced in November 12, 2016  and lasted until July 2017.

The second round was initially scheduled to take place from May 20, 2017 to July 16, 2017, three months after the end of the first round at the Biñan Football Stadium. The second round resumed in mid-October  at the PFF National Training Centre in Carmona, Cavite with format changes. The ten teams competing were divided into two groups randomly for the second round with each team playing against other teams of their group once. The overall standing will still be devised to determine the league winners.

A transfer window was open during a given period in between the first and second rounds

Clubs
11 teams participated in the inaugural season of the league. Kaya withdrew mid-season.

League table

Matches involving Kaya F.C. were annulled.

Results

First round

Kaya F.C. matches
Kaya F.C. withdrew from the league mid-season. They played six matches against six teams before their withdrawal. All results involving Kaya were voided and had no bearing with the overall standing.

Second round
The league's second round commenced on October 14, 2017. The ten teams were divided into two groups with each team facing the four other teams in its group once.

Honors
Individual awards
Most Valuable Player:  Sara Castañeda (De La Salle)
Best Goalkeeper:  Inna Palacios (De La Salle)
Best Defender:  Ivy Lopez (UST)
Best Midfielder:  Charisa Lemoran (UST)
Golden Boot:  Kyra Dimaandal (De La Salle) with 21 goals

Team
Fair Play Award: Fuego España F.C.

References

PFF Women's League
PFF Women's League
Philippines
PFF Women's League seasons
PFF Women's League
PFF Women's League